Sanna Charlotte Solberg-Isaksen (born 16 June 1990) is a Norwegian handball player for Team Esbjerg and the Norwegian national team.

She made her debut on the Norwegian national team in 2010.

She is a twin sister of Silje Solberg and is half Swedish through her mother.

Achievements
Olympic Games:
Bronze Medalist: 2016, 2020
World Championship:
Winner: 2015, 2021
Silver Medalist: 2017
European Championship:
Winner: 2014, 2016, 2020
Junior World Championship:
Winner: 2010
Junior European Championship:
Winner: 2009
EHF Cup:
Finalist: 2019
Norwegian Championship:
Winner: 2014/2015, 2015/2016
Norwegian Cup:
Winner: 2014, 2015
Finalist: 2011, 2012
Danish League:
Gold Medalist: 2019, 2020
Danish Cup:
Winner: 2017
Bronze Medalist: 2018

Individual awards
 All-Star Left Wing of the Junior World Championship: 2010
 All-Star Left Wing of Damehåndboldligaen: 2017/2018 
 All-Star Left Wing of EHF Champions League: 2020, 2022

References

External links
 Sanna Charlotte Solberg-Isaksen at the Norwegian Handball Federation 
 
 
 
 

1990 births
Living people
Sportspeople from Bærum
Norwegian people of Swedish descent
Twin sportspeople
Norwegian twins
Identical twins
Norwegian female handball players
Handball players at the 2016 Summer Olympics
Olympic handball players of Norway
Olympic bronze medalists for Norway
Medalists at the 2016 Summer Olympics
Olympic medalists in handball
Expatriate handball players
Norwegian expatriate sportspeople in Denmark
Handball players at the 2020 Summer Olympics
Medalists at the 2020 Summer Olympics